Kittilä mine, also known as Suurikuusikko mine, is a gold mine in Kittilä, in the Lapland County of Finland. Exploration began in 1986, and production started in 2008. The mine is composed of two open pits, with the proceeds of the operation funding an underground mining operation, accessed by a ramp from surface and utilizing both transverse and longitudinal long-hole stoping methods. The mine utilizes on-site concentrating to produce Doré bars for shipment off-site for refinement, and is scheduled to produce  of gold in 2009.

History
In 1986 gold was discovered near the town of Kittilä. The Geological Survey of Finland initiated exploration which resulted in a discovery of gold mineralization. Diamond drilling continued up to 1991, when exploration ended. In 1998 the property was sold to Svenska Platina AB, a junior mining company which was a subsidiary of Riddarhyttan Resources AB. Permitting for an open pit mine began in 2002, with a mining licence and permit secured in 2003. Agnico Eagle purchased a stake in Riddarhyttan (at the time feasibility studies suggested the resource was between 2—3.7 million ounces of gold) in 2004, with the remainder of the company being purchased in 2005. In September 2008 an additional  of drilling resulted in a gold reserve increase of two million ounces (5.7 million ounces total), over 18.2 million tonnes of ore, grading 5.12 grams per tonne. Excavation of the open pit began in September 2007 and ore production began in May 2008.

Mining operation

Open pit

Drilling is done using both Sandvik and Atlas Copco drill rigs, with ore being loaded into Caterpillar 777 dump trucks (pictured) by Caterpillar 385 hydraulic excavators. Mining in the pits is expected to last for up to five years. Proceeds from the pits are being used to finance the underground mining operation. The pit produces  of material per month, removing eight tons of waste per ton of ore.

Underground
Underground development began in October 2006. Underground mining will be done using long-hole stoping methods, either along strike (longitudinal) in the case of narrow areas (less than ), and perpendicular (transverse) to the ore body in the case of wider zones.

Processing
The ore is then sent to flotation cells where the gold (located in sulphide material) is separated from gangue material. This heat and the addition of oxygen separates the gold from the sulphide material. The separated material is then leached out using cyanide. The carbon is removed from the leached material and the gold is smelted into  Doré bars, which are sent off-site for further refining. Kittila realizes an average gold recovery of 92%, and has the capacity to produce up to four bars per week.

The Kittila mill also includes a bomb shelter, a legal requirement under a 1917 Finnish law which came into effect following Finnish independence from Russia. The shelter is open for viewing by visitors and contains emergency supplies such as oxygen tanks, food, drink and a set of golf clubs.

References

Underground mines in Finland
Surface mines in Finland
Gold mines in Finland